Toykino (Tuykagurt) is a rural locality (a village) in Novokilbakhtinsky Selsoviet, Kaltasinsky District, Bashkortostan, Russia. The population was 35 as of 2010. There are 2 streets.

Geography 
Toykino is located 30 km east of Kaltasy (the district's administrative centre) by road. Krasnokholmsky is the nearest rural locality.

References 

Rural localities in Kaltasinsky District